Homecoming (stylized as HΘMΣCΘMING; subtitled: "A Film by Beyoncé") is a 2019 concert film about American singer Beyoncé and her performance at the 2018 Coachella Valley Music and Arts Festival, written, executive produced and directed by Beyoncé herself. It was released on April 17, 2019 by Netflix.

The film is an "intimate, in-depth look" at the performance, revealing "the emotional road from creative concept to a cultural movement".

Homecoming was released to widespread critical acclaim, with several publications naming it one of the greatest concert films of all time. The film won Best Music Film at the 62nd Annual Grammy Awards and Best Music Documentary at the IDA Documentary Awards 2019.

Promotion
On April 3, 2019, it was reported that Beyoncé was working on new music, and also a collaborative project with Netflix which would be tied to her Coachella 2018 performance with additional footage. On April 6, 2019, Netflix officially teased the project by posting on social media a yellow image with the word "Homecoming" across it, and also the release date of the film. The film's trailer was eventually released on April 8, and was viewed over 16.6 million times across all Netflix social media accounts and Beyoncé's Facebook page within the first 24 hours. Upon the film's release, Beyoncé released a live album entitled Homecoming: The Live Album. Homecoming had 757,000 interactions across Facebook, Instagram and Twitter over its first week.

Release
Homecoming is the first of three projects Beyoncé has committed to Netflix, on a reportedly $60 million deal.

Several historically black colleges and universities had advanced screenings on April 16, including Howard and Texas Southern. Nielsen reported that the film was watched by 1.1 million in the US in its first day, excluding views on mobile devices and computers, which Variety noted may have resulted in a sizeable undercount of views due to the "youth-skewing makeup of the 'Homecoming' viewership." 55% of viewership in the first seven days came from African-Americans, higher than any other original streaming series or film tracked by Nielsen to date, ahead of Bird Box, which had 24% African-American viewership.

According to Netflix, Homecoming was the fourth most popular documentary offered on the platform in 2019, being the only concert film to appear on the list.

Critical response
Homecoming received widespread critical acclaim. The website's critics consensus simply states: "Beychella forever." On Metacritic, it has a weighted average score of 93 out of 100, based on 14 critics, indicating "universal acclaim".

Several publications named Homecoming as one of the greatest concert films of all time, including RogerEbert.com, The Washington Post, The Hollywood Reporter, Deadline, Refinery29, Chatelaine, The Guardian, and Chicago Sun-Times. Spencer Kornhaber of The Atlantic called Homecoming "one of Beyoncé's masterpieces", adding that the film's "combo of well-edited stage spectacle and behind-the-scenes segments—intimate, hard-fought, occasionally tense, politically explicit, personally specific segments—make it a career-defining document." David Ehrlich of IndieWire wrote that "Beyoncé managed to fit the whole spectacle into a euphoric, triumphant, and exhaustingly fierce documentary that should help see Beychella enshrined as one of the definitive pop culture events of the century."

Tobi Oredein of Metro described how Homecoming "reminds us that Beyoncé isn't just the greatest entertainer of all time, but the most exciting visionary in entertainment today." Andrea Valdez and Angela Watercutter of Wired named Homecoming as a "once-in-a-lifetime performance by one of the world's greatest living artists that our hyperconnected world allows everyone to celebrate together." Danielle Cadet wrote for Refinery29 that the film showcases Beyoncé's "world-class talent and work ethic, proving no one ever has nor ever will do it like she does."

Barrett Holmes of BBC described the film as "much more than a film about the first black woman to headline the Coachella music festival," saying "through including quotes and audio from black leaders and intellectuals, Homecoming displayed the beauty of black culture, and gave people the chance to celebrate the necessity of black education.....It is a celebration of black American culture with education, specifically Historically Black Colleges and Universities (HBCUs), serving as the foundation of her message." Judy Berman of Time magazine stated that the film "recontextualizes the show in a way that claims the most influential live music event in North America for black culture."

Accolades
Homecoming was named the greatest documentary of 2019 by The Daily Dot. The film was also included in Paste's list of the 15 best documentaries of 2019. Decider journalist Claire Spellberg placed Homecoming at number two on her list of the best in television and film in 2019. Homecoming was also named the third best movie of any genre of 2019 by both Thomas Atkinson for The Skinny and Ken Bakely for Film Pulse, while Decider named it seventh best. Homecoming ranked at number 1 on Metacritic's list of the best miniseries, TV movies and specials of 2019, and at number two on Rotten Tomatoes' list of the Best Reviewed TV & Streaming Movies of the same year. The Los Angeles Times ranked Beyoncé's Coachella set and Homecoming was placed at number 1 on its "The Millennium 200" list chronicling the greatest pop culture moments of the first 20 years of the millennium. Homecoming was declared by Letterboxd as the fourth greatest documentary or non-fiction film of the decade (2010s). Homecoming was included in Insider's list of the "21 Netflix originals everyone should watch in their lifetime, according to critics".

Homecoming won Best Music Film at the 62nd Annual Grammy Awards, marking the second winner in this category to be directed or co-directed by the artist, and the first individual African-American female artist to win since Janet Jackson in 1989.

Impact
English singer Rita Ora said that she was inspired by Homecoming when trying to perfect her own performances, calling it the "real deal". Homecoming also inspired the comeback of Irish group Westlife, who stated that in the film "you could see how much of a captain [Beyoncé] was on her own ship."  Cuban-American singer Camila Cabello said that Homecoming had a profound impact on her, praised the significance of the movie to the humanity. South Korean musician Wooseok cited Homecoming as his inspiration, praising its "quotes and lessons" and revelations of Beyoncé's "morals and work ethic".

Homecoming has been said to have set a trend of musicians releasing a film project on Netflix together with an album; Lonely Island's The Unauthorized Bash Brothers Experience, Thom Yorke's Anima, Sturgill Simpson's Sound & Fury, and Kid Cudi's Entergalactic are all cited as examples of projects that have followed the precedent that Homecoming set. Travis Scott's documentary Look Mom I Can Fly has also been cited as a film that follows in the footsteps of Homecoming. Lizzo's music video for "Good as Hell" was said to be inspired by Homecoming. Sheldon Pearce for Pitchfork wrote that Homecoming kickstarted the "ongoing uprising" where "black women have been demanding ownership of their outsized impact on culture"; Jamila Woods' LEGACY! LEGACY! and Rapsody's Eve, as well as exhibitions such as "Black Women: Power and Grace" and "Posing Modernity", are mentioned as later works that constitute the "formative syllabus" that started with Homecoming.

Canadian actress Sandra Oh dedicated her toast at the Time 100 Gala to Homecoming, calling the film "viscerally inspiring". Chelsea Clinton, in an interview with The Cut, complimented Beyoncé on working "herself body, mind, heart, soul, and spirit to get to that place" where she can perform after her difficult childbirth. American actress Sophia Bush said that with Homecoming, Beyoncé is "setting a really killer example for the creative process"." Former First Lady Michelle Obama praised Beyoncé's Homecoming, calling the film a tool to "inspire the next generation of history makers and record breakers who'll run the world in the next years ahead." The Hollywood Reporter published an essay on Homecoming by American screenwriter, producer, and actress Lena Waithe, where she praised Homecoming "a tribute to blackness" and "a love letter to historically black colleges and universities".

Many celebrations for Black History Month 2020 commemorated Homecoming. Footage from Homecoming was featured at the start of Google's advert for Black History Month, which shows the opening of Beyoncé's performance and states that it is the most searched performance on the site. Georgia Southern University hosted a panel discussion for Black History Month on the cultural and social importance of Homecoming to African-Americans. Advertising agency Momentum Worldwide (part of McCann Worldgroup) curated a "Black History Museum", which exhibited merchandise from Homecoming, whilst Spark Noir hosted a screening of Homecoming followed by a discussion about Beyoncé's contribution to culture. Netflix featured Homecoming under "Black Superheroes" in their Black History Month collection amongst comic-book heroes such as Black Panther and Luke Cage.

Through the tribute to HBCU culture in Homecoming, Beyoncé increased people's interest in HBCUs. High school seniors cited Homecoming as the reason that they were considering attending HBCUs, while younger students were also said to be interested in HBCUs due to the film. American actress Regina Hall opened the BET Awards 2019 with an homage to Homecoming entitled "Homegrown", parodying the opening to Beyoncé's performance as well as the documentary sections of the film. American sitcom Grown-ish also paid homage to Homecoming. The cast of Queer Eye paid tribute to Homecoming during their performance on Lip Sync Battle. A 9-feet-tall statue of Beyoncé as seen on the Homecoming poster was unveiled at Mercedes-Benz Arena in Berlin. UCLA gymnast Nia Dennis performed a routine inspired by Homecoming, receiving a score of 9.975 as well as praise from celebrities after going viral on social media.

In order to entertain and connect people who are participating in self-isolation and social distancing during the COVID-19 pandemic, Beyoncé's fans (led by Netflix's editorial manager Jasmyn Lawson) organised a virtual watch party of Homecoming. Hashtagged "#HOMEcoming", the watch party was the top trending topic on Twitter worldwide with half a million tweets, and its participants included Kerry Washington, Jack Dorsey, Holly Robinson Peete, Erica Baker, and the Smithsonian Institution's National Museum of African American History and Culture. The REACH Opening Festival at the Kennedy Center closed with a screening of Homecoming. The Museum of the Moving Image screened Homecoming as part of Curators' Choice 2019. Red Hot Arts in Australia hosted an outdoor screening of Homecoming singers and musicians playing tribute to the film. Balmain creative director Olivier Rousteing described Beyoncé as a visionary, saying "She really is an inspiration — she wants to share a vision with you, and there are never any limits.", and spoke on Beyoncé's opening costume, saying the team "wanted to create something truly iconic, something that instantly felt forever and timeless and historic." He also said "The strength of Beyoncé is whatever she does, a lot of people are inspired by her. [But] when you do one thing for Beyoncé, no one can have the same thing".

Music director Derek Dixie spoke on Homecoming being nominated for an Emmy Award: "(Beyoncé) has tons and tons of classic records that when putting the show together, you have to maintain the classic feel of the record but make it feel like you're in a stadium at homecoming." Ric Lipson of Stufish, who designed the pyramidal stage for Homecoming, said "we've never really won — or been nominated for even — a prestigious thing like the Emmys. We all knew this was going to be something special, but I don't think anyone realized how special." Lipson described the work on Homecoming as "a great challenge", since he needed to fulfil Beyoncé's vision "which was to evoke the aesthetic and energy of American historic black colleges, yet still look like a work of art." Stufish designed dozens of pyramid structures for the stage, with the final design "literally pushing the boundaries of what the festival would allow." This stage was also displayed at the 2019 Coachella Valley Music and Arts Festival, which Los Angeles Times calls "a living piece of Beychella history".

Tyler Perry paid homage to the performance and the documentary in his 2022 Netflix film A Madea Homecoming.

Music

Homecoming: The Live Album was released at the same time as the documentary, with no prior announcement. The album featured 36 live tracks, 2 spoken word interludes and 2 new tracks, an official release of "I Been On" and a cover of Maze's "Before I Let Go".

References

External links

Homecoming at Metacritic

2019 films
2019 documentary films
American documentary films
Beyoncé
Concert films
Documentary films about singers
Films directed by Beyoncé
Films shot in California
Live video albums
Netflix specials
Grammy Award for Best Long Form Music Video
2019 directorial debut films
Documentary films about women in music
2010s English-language films
2010s American films